Nathan Caine (born 20 November 2002) is an English professional footballer who plays as a forward for Stalybridge Celtic.

Playing career
Caine made his senior debut for Mansfield Town on 10 November 2020, coming on as an 88th-minute substitute for Jamie Reid in a 2–1 victory at Scunthorpe United in the EFL Trophy. He turned professional at Mansfield Town in May 2021 after scoring some important goals for academy manager Richard Cooper. He joined Southern League Premier Division Central side Nuneaton Borough on a one-month loan starting on 22 September. On 6 January 2022, Caine joined Northern Premier League Division One Midlands side Ilkeston Town on a one-month loan deal. On 25 February 2022, Caine joined Northern Premier League Division One Midlands side Sutton Coldfield Town on a one-month loan deal. On 25 March 2022, the loan was extended for the remainder of the 2021–22 season. Caine was released by Mansfield at the end of the 2021–22 season.

Following his release from Mansfield, Caine joined Stafford Rangers before transfering to Stalybridge Celtic in October 2022.

Style of play
Caine is a forward with clever movement.

Statistics

References

2002 births
Living people
People from Stockport
English footballers
Association football forwards
Rochdale A.F.C. players
Mansfield Town F.C. players
Nuneaton Borough F.C. players
Ilkeston Town F.C. players
Sutton Coldfield Town F.C. players
Stafford Rangers F.C. players
Stalybridge Celtic F.C. players
English Football League players
Southern Football League players
Northern Premier League players